Hazel Green Airport  is a privately owned airport, located four nautical miles (7 km) west of the central business district of Hazel Green, a community in Madison County, Alabama, United States.

Facilities and aircraft 
It has one runway designated 7/25 with an asphalt surface measuring 2,670 by 40 feet (814 x 12 m).

For the 12-month period ending October 29, 1997, the airport had 11,240 general aviation aircraft operations, an average of 30 per day. At that time there were 20 aircraft based at this airport: 90% single-engine and 10% glider.

References

External links 
 Aerial image as of 11 March 1997 from USGS The National Map
 Airfield photos for M38 from Civil Air Patrol

Airports in Madison County, Alabama
Privately owned airports